This is a list of television programs broadcast by Mya in Italy.

Television series
2 Broke Girls
Ally McBeal
American Dreams
Better with You
The Bold and the Beautiful
Boston Legal
The Closer
Dharma & Greg
Falcon Beach
Friends
Gilmore Girls
Gossip Girl
Grey's Anatomy
Hart of Dixie
Men in Trees
Mercy
The Nanny
Nip/Tuck
One Tree Hill
Pretty Little Liars
Privileged
Rizzoli & Isles
Saving Grace
The Secret Circle
Shameless
Skins
The Starter Wife
Sturm der Liebe
Tru Calling
The Tudors
United States of Tara
The Vampire Diaries
Veronica Mars
What I Like About You

Mediaset
Programmes Mya
Mya